George Brydges, 6th Baron Chandos (1620–1654), was the son of Grey Brydges, 5th Baron Chandos (c. 1580 – 10 August 1621) and Lady Anne Stanley, a descendant of King Henry VIII's sister, Princess Mary Tudor. George's stepfather was Mervyn Tuchet, 2nd Earl of Castlehaven. In 1621, George succeeded his father as Baron Chandos, being only one year old.

George was a supporter of King Charles I of England, during his struggle with Parliament, and distinguished himself at the first Battle of Newbury in 1643. Afterwards, he fought in the west of England. At the close of the First English Civil War, he paid a large fine to Parliament.

In 1649, after the end of the civil war, Parliament ordered the slighting of his residence, Sudeley Castle, to ensure that it could never again be used as a military post. In 1650, he received some financial compensation for the loss of the castle but not enough for reconstruction. The castle remained semi-derelict.

George Brydges firstly married Lady Susan Montagu, daughter of Henry Montagu, 1st Earl of Manchester, by whom he had three daughters, and secondly, Lady Jane Savage, daughter of John Savage, 2nd Earl Rivers, by whom he had another three daughters. His brother, William Brydges, succeeded him as 7th Baron Chandos. William died in 1676, and was succeeded as 8th Baron by a kinsman, James Brydges, who was English ambassador to the Ottoman Empire, from 1680 to 1685.

On 13 May 1653, George killed Colonel Henry Compton, son of Sir Henry Compton, in one of the first recorded duels at Putney, and was tried and found guilty of manslaughter on 17 May 1654 after a long imprisonment. On 6 February 1654, he died of smallpox, and was buried at Sudeley Castle, his residence.

References

Attribution

1620 births
1655 deaths
Cavaliers
Deaths from smallpox
English duellists
Lord-Lieutenants of Gloucestershire
Ge
Burials at St Mary's Chapel, Sudeley Castle
6